Arches Fork is a stream in the U.S. state of West Virginia.

Arches Fork derives its name from Archibald Woods, a surveyor.

See also
List of rivers of West Virginia

References

Rivers of Wetzel County, West Virginia
Rivers of West Virginia